|}

The Stayers' Hurdle is a Grade 1 National Hunt hurdle race in Great Britain. It is open to horses aged four years or older. It is run on the New Course at Cheltenham over a distance of about 3 miles (2 miles 7 furlongs and 213 yards, or 4,785 metres), with twelve hurdles to be jumped. The race is scheduled to take place each year during the Cheltenham Festival in March.

It is the leading long-distance hurdle event in the National Hunt calendar and the feature race on the third day of the Festival.

History
The inaugural race was run in 1912 at Prestbury Park over 3 miles with £100 (£200 in 1913) prize money to the winner and £10 to the runner-up. It was called "Stayers Selling Hurdle" and was a Weight for Age Selling type of event with the winning horse being sold for £50 after the race. The race was dropped from the festival programme twice during 1928–1929 and in 1939–1945 but in 1946 it replaced the Spa Hurdle which was previously run in 1923 and 1942 over 2 miles. From 1946 to 1967 the Spa Hurdle was run over the same 3 miles until being renamed in 1972 as the Stayers' Hurdle, when it was sponsored by Lloyds Bank. It was backed by Waterford Crystal from 1978 to 1990, and by Bonusprint from 1991 to 2004. The race used to be held on either the Tuesday or the Wednesday of the Festival, but it was moved to the Thursday in 1993.

The title of the race was changed to the World Hurdle when Ladbrokes took over the sponsorship in 2005. Their sponsorship came to an end with the 2015 renewal and the 2016 race was sponsored by Ryanair. In 2017 and 2018 it was sponsored by Sun Bets and the title reverted to the Stayers' Hurdle. In 2019 the race was sponsored by Sun Racing. and Paddy Power has sponsored the race since 2020.

Records
Most successful horse since 1972 (4 wins):
 Big Buck's – 2009, 2010, 2011, 2012

Leading jockey since 1972 (5 wins):
 Ruby Walsh – Big Buck's (2009, 2010, 2011, 2012), Nichols Canyon (2017)

Leading trainer since 1972 (4 wins):
 Paul Nicholls– Big Buck's (2009, 2010, 2011, 2012)

Leading owner since 1972 (4 wins):
 The Stewart Family – Big Buck's (2009, 2010, 2011, 2012)
 Andrea & Graham Wylie – Inglis Drever (2005, 2007, 2008), Nichols Canyon (2017)
 J. P. McManus -Baracouda (2002, 2003), More Of That (2014),Sire Du Berlais (2023)

List of renewals
 Separate divisions of the race indicated by (1) and (2).

See also
 Horse racing in Great Britain
 List of British National Hunt races

References

 Racing Post:

 thejockeyclub.co.uk/cheltenham/ – Media information pack (2010).
 pedigreequery.com – World Hurdle – Cheltenham.

External links
 Race Recordings 

National Hunt races in Great Britain
Cheltenham Racecourse
National Hunt hurdle races